Kraljeva Sutjeska is a Bosnian Franciscan monastery in Bosnia and Herzegovina. It is located near Kakanj, in the village of Kraljeva Sutjeska.

It includes a museum in which it houses historical treasures, a library which keeps rare and valuable historical records. There are around 11,000 works in the library, including 31 incunabula and works in Bosnian Cyrillic. The earliest parish register is preserved since 1641. There are also a number of Ottoman Turkish documents.

It also includes Grgurevo, a site where the kings' castle from 1330 along with his remains are located.

The historically important dwelling of Bosnian kings, Bobovac, is also a short distance from the castle remains and the monastery, as well as other sights of Kraljeva Sutjeska.

See also
 Franciscan Province of Bosna Srebrena

References

External links
 

Kraljeva Sutjeska
Christian monasteries established in the 14th century